Laurindo António Leal Tavares (born 15 June 1982 in Lisbon), known simply as Laurindo, is a Portuguese former professional footballer who played as a midfielder.

References

External links

1982 births
Living people
Portuguese sportspeople of Cape Verdean descent
Portuguese footballers
Footballers from Lisbon
Association football midfielders
Liga Portugal 2 players
Segunda Divisão players
Real S.C. players
Odivelas F.C. players
C.D. Olivais e Moscavide players
C.D. Pinhalnovense players
Atlético Clube de Portugal players
F.C. Arouca players
U.D. Oliveirense players
C.D. Mafra players
Clube Oriental de Lisboa players
Cypriot Second Division players
Olympiakos Nicosia players
Portuguese expatriate footballers
Expatriate footballers in Cyprus
Portuguese expatriate sportspeople in Cyprus